Lawrence Mishel is distinguished fellow at the Economic Policy Institute in Washington, D.C., a pro-labor think-tank that seeks to advance the interests of American workers. He has been at EPI since 1987, first serving as Research Director, then as Vice-president and then as president from 2002 to 2017.

Mishel is the senior author of EPI's biannual (even-numbered years) flagship publication, The State of Working America, a comprehensive summary of the United States labor market and living standards, which first appeared in 1988.

From the EPI Web site a/o Feb. '09:
"Areas of expertise: Income distribution and poverty - Labor markets - Industrial relations - Technology and productivity - Education - Wages - Unions and collective bargaining
"A nationally recognized economist, Mishel is frequently called on to testify and provide economic briefings to members of Congress and appears regularly as a commentator on the economy in print and broadcast media. ...
"Education: Ph.D. Economics, University of Wisconsin; M.A. Economics, American University; B.S. Pennsylvania State University."

Paul Krugman, a Nobel laureate in economics and a noted progressive columnist, argued in Nov. '08 that, given the centrist makeup of President Barack Obama's economic inner circle, the new Economic Recovery Advisory Board could be used to "give progressive economists a voice," and mentioned Mishel among others as a progressive economist who might be suitable for the board.

Also from EPI Web site a/o Feb. '09: "Most recently [no date or specific link given], [Mishel] wrote a paper outlining a plan to stimulate the economy, which was widely adopted by policy makers in Washington and beyond." In mid-Feb. '09, Mishel, with EPI research and policy director John Irons, issued a statement about the Economic Stimulus Act of 2009, applauding it as far as it went but saying more needed to be done.

Mishel published analysis in April 2021 finding that erosion in union collective bargaining power since 1979 had reduced the potential median hourly wage for men by 11.6% by 2017, and by 7.9% among all workers.

Bibliography

References

External links 

The State of Working America
Lawrence Mishel, Distinguished Fellow, EPI

21st-century American economists
American University alumni
Economic Policy Institute
Living people
Pennsylvania State University alumni
University of Wisconsin–Madison College of Letters and Science alumni
1953 births